Åbytorp is a locality situated in Kumla Municipality, Örebro County, Sweden with 755 inhabitants in 2010.

Riksdag elections

References

External links
 View on Wikimapia

Populated places in Örebro County
Populated places in Kumla Municipality